Novokytmanovo is a rural locality (a selo) in Novotarabinsky Selsoviet, Kytmanovsky District, Altai Krai, Russia. The population was 56 as of 2013. There are 2 streets.

Geography 
Novokytmanovo is located on the Taraba River, 32 km southwest of Kytmanovo (the district's administrative centre) by road. Losikha is the nearest rural locality.

References 

Rural localities in Kytmanovsky District